Nodata may refer to:

A lack of data
Benimakia nodata, a species of sea snail
Microcolona nodata, a species of moth
Pilsbryspira nodata, a species of sea snail